Kálmán Markovits (August 26, 1931 – December 5, 2009) was a Hungarian water polo player who competed in the 1952 Summer Olympics,  1956 Summer Olympics, and 1960 Summer Olympics.

He was born in Budapest.

Markovits was part of the Hungarian team which won the gold medal in the 1952 tournament. He played six matches and scored three goals.

Four years later he was a member of the Hungarian team which won again the gold medal in the 1956 Olympic tournament. He played six matches and scored at least three goals (not all scorers are known).

At the 1960 Games he won the bronze medal with the Hungarian team. He played four matches and scored one goal.

See also
 Hungary men's Olympic water polo team records and statistics
 List of Olympic champions in men's water polo
 List of Olympic medalists in water polo (men)
 List of members of the International Swimming Hall of Fame
 Blood in the Water match

External links
 

1931 births
2009 deaths
Hungarian male water polo players
Olympic water polo players of Hungary
Water polo players at the 1952 Summer Olympics
Water polo players at the 1956 Summer Olympics
Water polo players at the 1960 Summer Olympics
Olympic gold medalists for Hungary
Olympic bronze medalists for Hungary
Olympic medalists in water polo
Medalists at the 1960 Summer Olympics
Medalists at the 1956 Summer Olympics
Medalists at the 1952 Summer Olympics
Water polo players from Budapest